The International School of Kenya (ISK) is an international school for pre-kindergarten to grade 12 located on the outskirts of Nairobi, Kenya. It was established in 1976 and has a 25-hectare campus. The grounds used to be a large coffee plantation, and today, only a few of the original buildings remain. Students can study for a North American high school diploma or the International Baccalaureate Diploma. The institution is accredited by the MSA. ISK is a member of the Association of International Schools in Africa (AISA), The Council of International Schools, and Round Square.

International School of Kenya was ranked 7th out of the top 100 best high schools in Africa by Africa Almanac in 2003, based upon quality of education, student engagement, strength and activities of alumni, school profile, internet and news visibility.

Organization
The school formed from the 210293 Nairobi International School (NIS), but financial troubles prompted the United States Embassy and Canadian High Commission to take over operations of the school in 1976, renaming it the International School of Kenya. ISK, as it is more commonly known, is divided into three schools: the Elementary School which teaches students from pre-kindergarten to grade 5, the Middle School, which teaches grades 6-8, and the High School which teaches grades 9-12.

Each school has its own principal and counselor, and largely its own teaching staff, though some subject staff is shared. Teachers are predominantly from Canada, the United States, and the United Kingdom.

Facilities
Each school has classrooms and recreational areas, while the three schools share libraries, cafeterias, and sports and arts facilities. The Arts Center is acclaimed as the best theatre facility in Nairobi. The school has a gymnasium, an outdoor swimming pool, and two outdoor grass pitches. In 2006, a construction project was started to expand the high school. It was completed in December 2007, and students were moved in the following month.

Construction began on newer middle school facilities in 2018 and finished in 2021.

School sports include basketball, rugby, football, tennis, volleyball, track and field, ultimate frisbee, and swimming. Every year high school students participate in the international ISSEA tournaments for all sports and STEM fields.

The school is located on the outskirts of Nairobi at the end of Peponi Road and is surrounded by coffee plantations.

In 2018, construction began on a new middle school building. The project was completed in early 2021.

Students
The student body of approximately 1000 represents more than 65 different nationalities. Around a quarter are American, with Kenyan, British, Canadian, Danish, and Dutch following.

Notable alumni
Notable alumni of ISK include:

Dan Eldon, English photojournalist
Karen Graham, Canadian author and dietitian

References

External links

International School of Kenya

Educational institutions established in 1976
International schools in Nairobi
Private schools in Kenya
International Baccalaureate schools in Kenya
1976 establishments in Kenya